Food orange 7, the ethyl ester of beta-apo-8'-carotenic acid, is a carotenoid with an orange-red color.  It is found in small quantities in some plants, but is often produced commercially from apocarotenal (E160e).  It is used as a food coloring under the E number E160f and is approved for use in the EU and Australia and New Zealand  where it is listed as food additive 160f; it is banned in the United States.

References

Food colorings
Apocarotenoids
Ethyl esters
Cyclohexenes